Life After Life was an American self-described gypsy punk band (also referred to as a psychedelic punk band),  active from 1993–1998 and based in San Francisco, California, United States. The group featured Jim Čert, an accordion-playing folk singer originally from the Czech Republic, Jaroslav Erno Šedivý, a Czech drummer noted for his collaborative work with Plastic People of the Universe, and four American musicians involved in the Bay Area rock scene.

History
Čert and Sedivy were both known for their dissent against the Communist regime in the '80s Czech music scene, prior to the Velvet Revolution in Czech in late 1989. Both were jailed several times for creating music deemed "anti-social" by the Communist state, who would not let musicians perform without state approval. However, files found in 1989 show that Čert was involved with state, working under police pressure as a secret informant.

When Čert and Sedivy found themselves in the United States in the early 1990s, they decided to start a band with local musicians. The original Life After Life lineup debuted on New Year's Eve, 1993, as a five-piece omitting Schmeckie, who joined in 1994.

The band caught the attention of San Francisco musician and political activist Jello Biafra, the former frontman of noted pioneering hardcore punk band the Dead Kennedys, and head of the Alternative Tentacles record label. Biafra enthusiastically signed them, excited to have found "a S.F. band with a totally unique sound". The group debuted with a single entitled Harrahya before releasing an album entitled Just Trip. The material on these two releases consisted of songs by written Čert, including "Marijuana," an ode to the illegal drug with lyrics written by noted pro-marijuana activist David Peel, and material composed by the group as a whole based on guitar riffs by Perkins. As a bonus track, Just Trip also included a cover of Willie Nelson's "Still Is Still Moving To Me", featuring Biafra on lead vocals, originally released on the Nelson tribute album Twisted Wille.

The band disbanded in the late '90s when Čert emigrated back to Prague. Talk of a reunion arises occasionally.

Discography

Albums and singles
 Harrahya b/w Doors (7", Alternative Tentacles, 1995)
 Just Trip (CD/LP, Alternative Tentacles, 1997)

Compilation appearances
The Day the Needles Stood Still (CD, Alternative Tentacles, w/ "Harrahya", "Doors" and "Mexico", from 7" sessions)
Twisted Willie (CD, w/ "Still Is Still Moving to Me")

References

External links
 Life After Life at MySpace
 Biography on Alternative Tentacles' Web site

Musical groups from San Francisco
Czech punk rock groups
Alternative Tentacles artists
Musical groups established in 1993
1993 establishments in the Czech Republic
Musical groups disestablished in 1998